Hadith al-Silsilah al-Dhahab (Hadith of the Golden Chain) is a hadith narrated from Ali al-Ridha, the eighth Imam of the Shia. The "chain" is a reference to the continuity of spiritual authority which is passed down from Muhammad to Ali ibn Abi Talib, through each of the Imams, to Imam Ridha. As transmitters of Hadith, the Imams link subsequent generations to the teachings of Mohammad. This transmission makes the Hadith of the Golden Chain valued as among the most truthful and accurate of all Hadiths for the Shi'ite.

The hadith is important to Shia because it implies that, on the one hand, monotheism takes believers to "Allah's fortress", which is a safe shelter, and on the other hand the Imamah is a fundamental precondition of entering this shelter.

Background
The story is that when thousands of people gathered to welcome their Ali al-Ridha's arrival at the entrance to Neyshabour , some of the scholars requested him to pronounce a hadith. According to some shia scholars, twenty (or ten or thirty) thousands have narrated this event, but only fifty narrations are available.   
The chain of the narrators of the hadith reaches the Prophet of Islam through Ahl al-Bayt, hence called Hadith of Golden Chain.

Several Important hadith collections quoted it as Al-Tawhid, Ma'ani al-Akhbar, and Oyoun Akhbar Al-Ridha of al-Shaykh al-Saduq and Al-Amali of Shaykh Tusi. The hadith is also narrated in sunni hadith books. Regarding the implications of the hadith, there are two extreme opinions by Sunni scholars; While some of them discrediting the hadith by implying that the Sunni books lack it, some others claim that all Sunni scholars accepted it.

According to shia, two important points may be derived from the Hadith. On one hand, monotheism takes the believers to "Allah's fortress", which is a safe shelter, and from the other hand Imamah is a fundamental precondition of entering this shelter .

Hadith
Hadith al-Silsilah al-Dhahab is narrated by Ali ibn Musa al-Ridha while entering Neyshabour. Many historians have recorded it. Old documents quote the hadith with small different wordings.

When Ali al-Ridha was entering Neyshabour a large crowd had gathered outside the city and some of the great scholars such as Muhammad ibn al-Rafi, Ahmad ibn al-Harith, Ishaq ibn al-Rahuwayh, and Yahya ibn al-Yahya were accompanying him. Twenty (or ten or thirty) thousands have reported the event. The narrations mentioning "twenty thousands" reporters are more famous. Many sunni laymen and scholars participated in welcoming the Imam. Scholars asked  Ali al-Ridha to narrate hadith for them. So  Ali al-Ridha announced al-Silsilah al-Dhahab.

Shia narrations
Different Shia hadith collections such as Al-Tawhid, Maani Al-Akhbar, and Oyoun Akhbar Al-Ridha of Shaykh al-Saduq and Al-Amali of Shaykh Tusi has narrated this hadith. Some of the sources are mentioned here:

 Ahsan al-Maqaal:

 Ma'ani al-Akhbar, Oyoun Akhbar Al-Ridha,  Al-Tawhid:

Also other versions of this hadith are separately narrated in Oyoun Akhbar Al-Ridha, Al-Tawhid, and Al-Ma'ani al-Akhbar by Shaykh al-Saduq, al-Amali by Shaykh Tusi and Kashf al-Ghommah by Allamah Arbeli.

Sunni narrations

Many sunni scholars have narrated this event.  Only fifty narrations have survived since third century out of ten thousands or twenty thousands or thirty thousands narrations. Besides, there are many other hadiths titled "al-Silsilah al-Dhahab hadith" varying from the one in question. Two of the important narrations are the "Fortress narration" and the "Faith narration".

The Fortress narration
There exists two different viewpoints among Sunni scholars regarding the Fortress Narration. Some of them mention Abu al-Salt Abd al-Salam ibn Heravi as the only narrator of this hadith and have disqualified him as a narrator, and consequently disregard the hadith. On the other hand, some of the sunni scholars regard Abu al-Salt as highly credible and therefore confirm the hadith, and some others even suggested healing powers for the hadith.

The part specifying 'condition'
Although the last part of the hadith ("There are few conditions and I am one of its conditions") is omitted in most sunni hadith books, some of the sunni scholars such as Khaje Parsa Hanafi and Qazi Bahjat Affandi Shafi'i have mentioned this part in their narration.

Al-Silsilah al-Dhahab in Hadith terminology

Hadith terminology categorize Hadith into several sections. According to authenticity or weakness of Hadith, Each hadith can be placed in different categories. The following are some important topics that are discussed about Al-Silsilah al-Dhahab.

Al-Silsilah al-Dhahab is a Hadith Qudsi, i.e., the word of God, but differs from Quran. The Gabriel transmitted hadith from God to prophet. Al-Silsilah al-Dhahab is Mutawatir. Shia and sunni scholars have narrated the hadith by Different expressions with authenticity. This hadith is  Musalsal meaning that it's a word of God and is conveyed from Prophet of Islam through Ahl al-Bayt to  Ali al-Ridha. In other word, narrators of the hadith are Prophet and Ahl al-Bayt. According to shia view they are infallible and immune from error in practical matters, in inviting people to the religion and in perceiving the realm of cognition. because of that the hadith is called golden chain. Because of that, this hadith was named Al-Silsilah al-Dhahab. Al-Silsilah al-Dhahab is Musnad. Twenty (or ten or thirty) thousands have narrated this event, but only fifty narrations are available. The chain of the narrators of the hadith reaches the Prophet of Islam through Ahl al-Bayt, hence called Hadith of Golden Chain.

Notes

See also

 Al-Risalah al-Dhahabiah
 Al-Sahifat al-Ridha
 Hadith of the two weighty things
 Hadith of the pond of Khumm

References

External links
  Silsilat Al-Dhahab 

Hadith
Shia literature
9th century in Iran
Ali al-Ridha